Elisheba was the wife of the Israelite prophet Aaron, who was the elder brother of Moses and the first High Priest of Israel, according to the Hebrew Bible. 

She was said to be a daughter of Amminadab from the Tribe of Judah, and a sister of Nahshon from the Tribe of Judah (Book of Exodus). The Hebrew name is composed of two parts; in one interpretation, "Eli" means "my God" and "sheba" means "oath". The name Eli-sheba can thus be translated as "God is (my) oath".

The Hebrew Bible records that Elisheba and Aaron had four sons: Nadab and Abihu, Eleazar, and Ithamar. In order to be legitimately recognized as hereditary priests, Jews are required by halakha to be Levites of direct patrilineal descent from Eleazar and Ithamar, the two youngest sons of Aaron and Elisheba. 

In the first chapter of the Gospel of Luke in the New Testament, a woman named Elisavet is said to have been a descendant of Aaron and the wife of Zechariah, who was also a Jewish priest. Elisabet was a relative of Jesus' mother, Mary, and was the mother of John the Baptist with Zechariah.

Derivations of the name

In English 
Elizabeth is the common English-language variant of Elisabet, which is derived from Elisheba.

In Spanish/Portugese 
Isabella

In the Muslim world 
Alishba is a modern name that is believed to have been derived from an Arabic-language translation of Elisheba. It is prevalent among Muslims in the Indian subcontinent.

References

Women in the Hebrew Bible
Family of Aaron
Tribe of Judah
Book of Exodus people